Na Sung-soo (born August 13, 1993) is a South Korean football player for Yokohama FC.

Club statistics
Updated to 23 February 2016.

References

External links

Profile at Yokohama FC

1993 births
Living people
South Korean footballers
J2 League players
Yokohama FC players
Association football midfielders
Footballers from Seoul